Fernanda Urdapilleta (born February 17, 1998) is a Mexican actress, model and singer.

Biography 
Maria Fernanda Urdapilleta Foullon was born on February 17, 1998, in Mexico City, Mexico. She began her career as a participant in the children's series Plaza Sésamo produced in Mexico in 2006 by Televisa, capturing the attention of child public. 
In 2010, she joined the Centro de Educación Artística (CEA), run by Televisa, and had small parts in soap operas like Olvidarte jamás, La fuerza del destino, sharing credits with David Zepeda and Sandra Echeverría, and Ni contigo ni sin ti working alongside Laura Carmine, Eduardo Santamarina and Erick Elias.

After graduating from the CEA, Urdapilleta was unveiled on television playing "Jenny" in La CQ, in 2012, which was produced by Pedro Ortiz de Pinedo. For her performance, she was nominated for the Kids Choice Awards Mexico as "Favorite Actress" being the winner of the category. Urdapilleta also debuted as a singer on La CQ after releasing an album with her co-stars.

In 2016 producer Juan Osorio offered Urdapilleta a co-youth starring role in the telenovela Sueño de amor as "Salma Kuri Fierro" a role where she disclosed more, gaining a good acceptance among the young audiences and sharing credits with Betty Monroe and Cristián de la Fuente.

Filmography

Awards and nominations

References

External links 
 

1998 births
21st-century Mexican actresses
Living people
Mexican feminists
Mexican telenovela actresses
Mexican television actresses
Actresses from Mexico City